Monika Maria Brodka (born 7 February 1988) is a Polish singer, who rose to fame as the winner of the third season of Polish Pop Idol (Idol) in 2004. She has since released 3 albums, including the 2010 album Granda which received critical acclaim in Poland and abroad. Brodka has received several nominations to the Fryderyk award, while her singles "Ten", "Dziewczyna Mojego Chłopaka", "Miałeś być" and "Znam Cię Na Pamięć" have all topped the official Polish Music Charts.

History

Early career

After winning the 2004 edition of Polish Pop idol, Monika Brodka released her first studio record titled Album, which was certified gold after a months.
In November 2006, she released her second album, Moje piosenki (My Songs), which also turned gold.

Granda

After a four-year hiatus, Brodka's third studio album Granda was released in September 2010. The album showed a big change of musical direction, and was described in The Guardian as "drawing on electro, rock and roots music, but remaining resolutely pop in its approach and execution, the record has a vitality and adventurousness that puts most of Poland's alt-rock acts to shame". Granda was certified double platinum in Poland in November 2011.

LAX EP

In May 2012, Brodka released an extended play LAX, which was recorded at Red Bull Studios in Los Angeles together with music producer and engineer Bartosz Dziedzic. The EP contains two new songs in English, "Varsovie" and "Dancing Shoes", as well as some remixes. Brodka won the 2013 Fryderyk award for Song of the Year ("Varsovie"), and received two nominations in categories Album of the Year (LAX) and Artist of the Year.

Brut 
On March 3, 2021, Brodka released the music video for her single ''Game Change''. Brodka's fifth studio album Brut was released on May 28, 2021. In the 2021 edition of the Berlin Music Video Awards, Brodka was nominated for Best Art Director with her music video ''Game Change''. The music video ''Horyzont'' by Piernikowski, in which Brodka features, was also selected for the official selection of the Berlin Music Video Awards for the Best Visual Effects category.

Discography

Albums

Extended plays

Live albums

Singles

References

External links

 Official homepage
 Awards
 Full Artist Discography
 Pop musik: the sound of the charts in … Poland
Monika Brodka at culture.pl

1987 births
Living people
Idols (TV series) winners
Polish pop singers
English-language singers from Poland
Polish lyricists
21st-century Polish singers
21st-century Polish women singers
People from Żywiec
MTV Europe Music Award winners